The Secret of Comedy is the second studio album by composer and producer Kramer, released on August 5, 1994, by Shimmy Disc.

Track listing

Personnel 
Adapted from The Secret of Comedy liner notes.

Musicians
 Bill Bacon – drums, percussion
 Randolph A. Hudson III – guitar
 Kramer – vocals, slide guitar, bass guitar, electric piano, synthesizer, mellotron, flute, tape, percussion, production, engineering

Production and additional personnel
 DAM – design
 Michael Macioce – photography
 Steve Watson – assistant producer, assistant engineer

Release history

References

External links 
 The Secret of Comedy at Discogs (list of releases)

1994 albums
Albums produced by Kramer (musician)
Kramer (musician) albums
Shimmy Disc albums